Gloria Monty (August 12, 1921 – March 30, 2006) was an American television producer working primarily in the field of daytime drama.

Education
Born Gloria Montemuro in Allenhurst, New Jersey and raised in the West Allenhurst neighborhood of Ocean Township, Monmouth County, New Jersey, she attended the University of Iowa, New York University, and Columbia University, where she earned her master's degree in drama.

Theatre work
In 1952, she married writer and editor Robert O'Byrne, with whom she had founded a New York theater group, Abbe Theater School. With O'Byrne, Monty directed summer stock productions and led acting and speech workshops at The New School in New York City, where her pupils included Marlon Brando, Demi Moore and Tony Curtis.

TV career
After directing shows such as The First Hundred Years, The Secret Storm (for many years), and Bright Promise, she is best known for taking over the ailing ABC Daytime serial General Hospital in 1978 as Executive Producer. Fred Silverman, the head of ABC, gave Monty thirteen weeks to turn the show around, with cancellation threatened if she did not succeed. It subsequently became the top-rated American daytime drama and won several Daytime Emmy Awards.

To accomplish this turnaround, she increased the show's pace, and focused main storylines on younger characters to reach out to younger viewers, particularly the pairing of ingenue Laura Spencer (Genie Francis) and troubled criminal Luke Spencer (Anthony Geary, whom she knew from his stint on her previous series, Bright Promise). She gave the sets a more contemporary look and feel, and employed production techniques once used only in primetime. One major result of the "Monty Revolution" was the faster pace of the show, effectively doubling the number of scenes in each episode. She was known for her rigid work ethic and for being tough with the cast and crew. “She demand[ed] excellence, but she reward[ed] it,” said coordinating producer Jerry Balme.

Monty was accused of perpetuating dangerous misconceptions about rape, implicitly exalting violence against women. But Monty viewed the “rape” as a choreographed "seduction.” Under her tenure, General Hospital rose to the top spot in the ratings, with Luke and Laura's 1981 wedding being the highest rated episode in daytime history (about 30 million viewers in 13 million households). Monty's Revolution consisted of couples such as Luke/Laura, Frisco/Felicia, and Robert/Holly. She and various head writers also created the Quartermaine family, Bobbie Spencer, Luke Spencer, Lucy Coe, Robert Scorpio, Anna Devane, Robin Scorpio, the Cassadine family, and many other popular characters who would dominate the show in the 1980s and early 1990s.

General Hospital received cover stories in both People, Soap Opera Weekly, and Newsweek, which referred to Luke and Laura as the “Rhett Butler and Scarlett O'Hara of Soapland”. Included in the show's fan base were celebrities Elizabeth Taylor and Sammy Davis Jr., both of whom guest starred on the series. She was also the executive producer of the primetime serial The Hamptons. She employed many former daytime performers for this show. The serial was unusual because it was videotaped rather than being filmed. Monty announced her departure from General Hospital in 1986, working on her final episode as executive producer in January 1987. Her next two successors, H. Wesley Kenney (1987–1989) and Joseph Hardy (1989–1991), were both lauded by viewers, but GH fell out of first place in 1988 (with the ratings top spot being taken over by The Young and the Restless, the show that Kenney was hired from). By 1990, the show's ratings were starting to sag significantly. That December, ABC's daytime programming head Jackie Smith successfully hired Monty back as GH executive producer, and Monty resumed her role on February 13, 1991.

In early 1991, Monty lured Anthony Geary back to daytime, but not as the popular Luke Spencer. Instead, Monty went along with Geary's demand to play a brand new character, Bill Eckert, Luke's lookalike cousin. An entire new family, the blue-collar Eckerts, was ushered in, and quickly dominated storyline, while the longrunning Quartermaine family was phased out. Monty also fired a dozen actors, in what the press described as a "bloodbath", including actress Jennifer Guthrie, who played heroine Dawn Winthrop. After Monty appointed her sister, Norma Monty, as head writer, the ratings eroded further.

Monty's dismissal became inevitable between the declining ratings and the departure of popular cast members such as Tristan Rogers (Robert Scorpio) and Finola Hughes (Anna Devane, who Monty fired among much criticism). In early 1992, after only a year, Monty was replaced with Wendy Riche. She produced several made-for-television movies based on her friend Mary Higgins Clark's novels. She also chaired the New Jersey Motion Picture & Television Commission.

Honors
In 1997, a Golden Palm Star on the Palm Springs, California, Walk of Stars was dedicated to Monty.

Death
She and her sister moved to Rumson, New Jersey in 1994. Monty died on March 30, 2006 at Rancho Mirage, California from cancer, aged 84. She was buried at Saint Catharine's Cemetery, Sea Girt, New Jersey.

References

External links
 
 Shemadeit.org
 Boston.com
 Monmouth.edu
 Emmys.org
 Independent.gmnews.com
 Entertainment Weekly
 Time magazine
 Actorstrainingstudio.com
 The New York Times

American soap opera writers
1921 births
2006 deaths
American theatre directors
Women theatre directors
American women television producers
American television directors
People from Allenhurst, New Jersey
People from Ocean Township, Monmouth County, New Jersey
People from Rumson, New Jersey
Daytime Emmy Award winners
Soap opera producers
Deaths from cancer in California
Screenwriters from New Jersey
American women television writers
Women soap opera writers
20th-century American screenwriters
20th-century American women writers
American women television directors
New York University alumni
University of Iowa alumni
Columbia University School of the Arts alumni
Television producers from New Jersey
21st-century American women